("Book of Settlements"), often shortened to , is a medieval Icelandic written work which describes in considerable detail the settlement of Iceland by the Norse in the 9th and 10th centuries CE.

is divided into five parts and over 100 chapters. The first part tells of how the island was found. The latter parts count settlers quarter by quarter, beginning with west and ending with south. It traces important events and family history into the 12th century. More than 3,000 people and 1,400 settlements are described. It tells where each settler settled and provides a brief genealogy.  Sometimes short anecdote-like stories are also included.  lists 435 men ( or ) as the initial settlers, the majority of them settling in the northern and southwestern parts of the island. It remains an invaluable source on both the history and genealogy of the Icelandic people.
Some have suggested a single author, while others have believed it to have been put together when people met at things (assemblies).

Surviving versions
The first copy has not survived; the oldest surviving examples are copies made in the 13th and 14th centuries. The initial settlement of Iceland largely took place during the Viking Age between 870 and 930, but  mentions descendants significantly later than the actual settlement period, at least into the 11th century. 

Sturlubók by Sturla Þórðarson
 by Haukr Erlendsson, based on Sturlubók and a lost version by Styrmir Kárason
Melabók
Skarðsárbók
Þórðarbók

 is one of the main sources of information on the heathen religion of the settlers. According to Sveinbjörn Rafnsson, a tendency to overemphasize the role of Christianity is seen in the Sturlubók and  versions of  but less so in the Melabók.

See also 
 Cerball mac Dúnlainge

Notes

External links

Online publication of Landnámabók
Landnámabók - THE BOOK OF THE SETTLEMENT OF ICELAND / Translated by Rev. T ELLWOOD, M. A., London 1898, northvegr.org (archived)

Viking Age in Iceland
Medieval Iceland
9th century in Iceland
10th century in Iceland